Tewdrig ap Teithfallt, known simply as Tewdrig, was a king of the post-Roman Kingdom of Glywysing.  He abdicated in favour of his son Meurig (Maurice) and retired to live a hermitical life, but was recalled to lead his son's army against an intruding Saxon force. He won the battle, but was mortally wounded.

The context of the battle is one of Britons versus invading Saxons, without explicit religious overtones. Since Tewdrig held to a religious lifestyle and was killed while defending a Christian kingdom against pagans, by the standards of that day Tewdrig is considered to be a martyr and a saint. The Latin form of his name is given as 'Theodoric' and his feast day is 1 April. 
Tewdrig's name appears in a genealogy of Jesus College MS 20, in the line of one of his descendants, but the only substantive information about the person comes from the twelfth century Book of Llandaff.

The Book of Llandaff places Tewdrig's story in the territory of the historical Kingdom of Gwent (the southeastern part of modern Monmouthshire), though it states that he was a king of Glywysing. The ancient histories of the kingdoms of Gwent and Glywysing are intertwined, and he may have ruled both kingdoms.

Life 

There are three theories about the origins of name Tewdrig:
 a variant of the Germanic name Theodoric;
 it may have been North British, as the name Theodric had been a royal name in Bernicia and/or;
 or the Breton royal name Theuderic.

Tewdrig's father, Teithfallt, had also been a king, and the Book of Llandaff notes that during his reign the Saxons had devastated the border regions, chiefly to the northwest near Hereford (i.e., in the historical Kingdom of Ergyng), and also along the River Wye.

While king of Glywysing, Tewdrig ap Teithfallt had been a patron of the Church at Llandaff, with a history of success in battle. At some point in his reign, he abdicated in favour of his son Meurig in order to live a hermitical life at Tintern, a rocky place near a ford across the River Wye. When a Saxon threat to the kingdom emerged, he returned to lead a defence. He was successful, but at a battle or skirmish at or near the ford (called Rhyd Tintern), he was mortally wounded. He asked to be taken to Ynys Echni (called Flat Holm in English) for burial, but got no further than Mathern on an inlet of the Severn estuary, where he languished briefly and died. King Meurig built a church on the spot and buried his father's body there, giving the surrounding land to the Bishops of Llandaff; a bishops' palace was later built there. The place became known first as Merthyr Tewdrig ("Tewdrig the martyr"), and later as Mateyrn ("place of a king") or Mathern. Tewdrig's defence of his homeland was said to be sufficiently decisive that the Saxons would not dare to invade again for thirty years.

There is a minor hagiographic element in this story from the Book of Llandaff. On returning to secular service due to military necessity, Tewdrig is given the prophecy that he will be successful but will be mortally wounded; that a vehicle pulled by two stags, yoked, will appear and carry him towards his destination of Ynys Echni, but that he will die in peace three days after the battle. Wherever the stags halted, fountains gushed forth, but as they approached the Severn the wagon was broken, a very clear stream gushed forth and here Tewdric died.

A number of sources, such as Ussher's Brittanicarum Ecclesiarum Antiquitates (1639), cite Bishop Godwin's 1615 account of the medieval church at Mathern. Godwin said that he discovered a stone coffin by the altar in the church, containing the saint's bones, and that the skull was badly fractured. Ussher also repeats the account of the Book of Llandaff. In 1958 Hando also recounts the story told to him by an old lady who had lived in Mathern and who claimed to have seen for herself, in 1881, the stone coffin bearing the remains of St. Tewdrig with his mortal wound (a hole in the skull made by a spear-point) still visible.

Sources of information

The Book of Llandaff 

The Book of Llandaff was written c. 1125, at a time when the bishopric at Llandaff was struggling against the competing bishoprics at Saint David's and Hereford. The book was written specifically to justify the claims of Llandaff, and Tewdrig's story provides the reason why his son, Meurig ap Tewdrig, donated the lands near Mathern to the see of Llandaff.

Other sources 
Tewdrig is not mentioned by Nennius in the Historia Brittonum (c. 850). Lloyd's History of Wales (1911) mentions the Book of Llandaff's account of Tewdrig's combat at the crossing of the Wye, and notes that Merthyr Tewdrig is now called Mathern, but adds nothing further. Nedelec's History of the Early Cambro-British Christians (1879) retells the story from the Book of Llandaff, adding a number of unattributed details which are colourful but inconsequential. Turner's History of the Anglo-Saxons (1799) repeats the accounts of the Book of Llandaff and Bishop Godwin (citing Ussher as the source), but then adds that the Saxons in question were those of Wessex, led by Ceolwulf. No authority is provided for this claim.

The Iolo Manuscripts

The Iolo Manuscripts are a collection of manuscripts presented in the early nineteenth century by Edward Williams, who is better known as Iolo Morganwg. Containing elaborate genealogies that connect virtually everyone of note with everyone else of note (and with many connections to "Arthur"), they were at first accepted as genuine, but have since been shown to be an assortment of manuscripts, transcriptions, and fantasies, many invented by Iolo himself. There are many references to Tewdrig and his genealogy. A list of works tainted by their reliance on the material presented by Iolo (sometimes without attribution) would be quite long.

Sources

Bibliography 

 — from MSS. in the Libraries of Hengwrt, and of Jesus College (English translation)

References 

Monarchs of Morgannwg
Monarchs of Gwent
Medieval Welsh saints
6th-century Christian saints
6th-century Welsh monarchs
Monarchs of Glywysing